Don't Mess with the Dragon is the fourth studio album by Ozomatli. The song "City of Angels" is featured in the soundtrack for the video game Midnight Club: Los Angeles.

Track listing
 Can't Stop - 2:56
 City of Angels - 3:17
 After Party - 3:46
 Don't Mess with the Dragon - 3:23
 La Gallina - 3:05
 Magnolia Soul - 3:21
 Here We Go - 2:38
 La Temperatura - 3:03
 Violeta - 3:53
 Creo - 3:15
 When I Close My Eyes - 3:46
 La Segundo Mano - 3:32
 It's a Feeling - 3:19 (iTunes Bonus Track)

References

2007 albums
Ozomatli albums
Concord Records albums
Albums produced by Robert Carranza